Chloroclystis is a genus of moths in the family Geometridae first described by Jacob Hübner in 1825.

Description
Palpi with second joint thickly scaled and reaching beyond the sharp frontal tuft, third joint prominent. Antennae of male annulated. Hind tibia with two spur pairs. Abdomen with slight dorsal crests. Forewings with vein 3 from angle of cell. Vein 5 from middle of discocellulars and vein 6 from upper angle. Veins 10 and 11 stalked, and vein 10 anastomosing (fusing) with veins 7, 8 and 9 to form the large areole. Vein 11 becoming coincident with vein 12. Hindwings with vein 5 from middle of discocellulars. Vein 6 and 7 stalked, and vein 8 anastomosing with vein 7 to beyond middle of cell.

Species

Chloroclystis acervicosta
Chloroclystis actephilae
Chloroclystis alpnista
Chloroclystis ambundata
Chloroclystis analyta
Chloroclystis androgyna
Chloroclystis angelica
Chloroclystis annimasi
Chloroclystis apotoma
Chloroclystis approximata
Chloroclystis athaumasta
Chloroclystis atroviridis
Chloroclystis autopepla
Chloroclystis biangulata
Chloroclystis blanda
Chloroclystis boarmica
Chloroclystis bosora
Chloroclystis breyniae
Chloroclystis catastreptes
Chloroclystis catoglypta
Chloroclystis celidota
Chloroclystis coloptila
Chloroclystis comorana
Chloroclystis consocer
Chloroclystis continuata
Chloroclystis conversa
Chloroclystis costicavata
Chloroclystis cryptolopha
Chloroclystis cuneilinea
Chloroclystis decimana
Chloroclystis delosticha
Chloroclystis dentatissima
Chloroclystis distigma
Chloroclystis eichhorni
Chloroclystis elaeopa
Chloroclystis elaiachroma
Chloroclystis embolocosma
Chloroclystis ericinellae
Chloroclystis exilipicta
Chloroclystis exsanguis
Chloroclystis filata
Chloroclystis flaviornata
Chloroclystis fragilis
Chloroclystis gerberae
Chloroclystis grisea
Chloroclystis guttifera
Chloroclystis gymnoscelides
Chloroclystis hawkinsi
Chloroclystis horistes
Chloroclystis hypopyrrha
Chloroclystis hypotmeta
Chloroclystis ignava
Chloroclystis impudicis
Chloroclystis inaequata
Chloroclystis inductata
Chloroclystis infrazebrina
Chloroclystis inops
Chloroclystis invisibilis
Chloroclystis kampalensis
Chloroclystis katherina
Chloroclystis laetitia
Chloroclystis latifasciata
Chloroclystis leucopygata
Chloroclystis lichenodes
Chloroclystis luciana
Chloroclystis macroaedeagus
Chloroclystis manusela
Chloroclystis mariae
Chloroclystis metallospora
Chloroclystis mira
Chloroclystis mniochroa
Chloroclystis mokensis
Chloroclystis muscosa
Chloroclystis naga
Chloroclystis neoconversa
Chloroclystis nereis
Chloroclystis nigrilineata
Chloroclystis nudifunda
Chloroclystis obturgescens
Chloroclystis olivata
Chloroclystis omocydia
Chloroclystis onusta
Chloroclystis palaearctica
Chloroclystis pallidiplaga
Chloroclystis palmaria
Chloroclystis papillosa
Chloroclystis parthenia
Chloroclystis pauxillula
Chloroclystis perissa
Chloroclystis permixta
Chloroclystis phoenochyta
Chloroclystis pitoi
Chloroclystis plinthochyta
Chloroclystis poliophrica
Chloroclystis polygraphata
Chloroclystis primivernalis
Chloroclystis pugnax
Chloroclystis pyrrholopha
Chloroclystis pyrsodonta
Chloroclystis rectaria
Chloroclystis rhodopis
Chloroclystis rietzi
Chloroclystis roetschkei
Chloroclystis rotundaria
Chloroclystis rubicunda
Chloroclystis rubrinotata
Chloroclystis rubroviridis
Chloroclystis rufitincta
Chloroclystis rufofasciata
Chloroclystis ruptiscripta
Chloroclystis schoenei
Chloroclystis semiscripta
Chloroclystis senex
Chloroclystis sierraria
Chloroclystis solidifascia
Chloroclystis sordida
Chloroclystis speciosa
Chloroclystis sphragitis
Chloroclystis spissidentata
Chloroclystis stenophrica
Chloroclystis taraxichroma
Chloroclystis taxata
Chloroclystis thermastobrita
Chloroclystis torninubis
Chloroclystis tortuosa
Chloroclystis tridentata
Chloroclystis variospila
Chloroclystis v-ata
Chloroclystis velutina
Chloroclystis viridata
Chloroclystis viridigrisea
Chloroclystis xenisma
Chloroclystis zhuoxinensis

Species of unknown status
 Chloroclystis rostrata (Guenee, 1858), described as Eupithecia rostrata

Taxonomy
A number of synonyms have been revived and are now considered valid genera. These include:
 Ardonis Moore, 1888
 Axinoptera Hampson, 1893
 Bosara Walker, 1866
 Dasimatia Warren, 1858
 Eriopithex Warren, 1896
 Mesocolpia Warren, 1901
 Pasiphila Meyrick, 1883
 Pasiphilodes Warren, 1895
 Phrissogonus Butler, 1882
 Polysphalia Warren, 1906
 Ptychotheca Warren, 1906
 Pycnoloma Warren, 1906
 Rhinoprora Warren, 1895
 Syncosmia Warren, 1897

References

 
 

 
Eupitheciini